Woolwich Township is a township in Gloucester County, in the U.S. state of New Jersey. As of the 2020 United States census, the township's population was 12,577, an increase of 2,377 (+23.3%) from the 2010 census count of 10,200, which in turn reflected an increase of 7,168 (+236.4%) from the 3,032 counted at the 2000 census.

Woolwich was formed by royal charter on March 7, 1767 from portions of Greenwich Township and was incorporated as one of New Jersey's initial 104 townships by an act of the New Jersey Legislature on February 21, 1798. Portions of the township were taken to form Franklin Township (January 27, 1820), Spicer Township (March 13, 1844, now known as Harrison Township), West Woolwich Township (March 7, 1877, now known as Logan Township) and Swedesboro (April 9, 1902). The township was named for Woolwich, England.

Geography
According to the U.S. Census Bureau, the township had a total area of 21.39 square miles (55.41 km2), including 21.07 square miles (54.58 km2) of land and 0.32 square miles (0.83 km2) of water (1.50%).

Swedesboro is an independent municipality entirely surrounded by the township, making it part one of 21 pairs of "doughnut towns" in the state, where one municipality entirely surrounds another. The township borders the Gloucester County municipalities of East Greenwich Township, Harrison Township, Logan Township, Oldmans Township, Pilesgrove Township and South Harrison Township.

Unincorporated communities, localities and place names located partially or completely within the township include Asbury, Dilkes Mills, Lippencott, Porches Mill, Robbins, Rulons and Scull.

Demographics

2010 census

The Census Bureau's 2006–2010 American Community Survey showed that (in 2010 inflation-adjusted dollars) median household income was $109,360 (with a margin of error of +/− $6,043) and the median family income was $117,708 (+/− $6,397). Males had a median income of $82,370 (+/− $5,125) versus $52,083 (+/− $6,470) for females. The per capita income for the borough was $36,898 (+/− $2,081). About 3.6% of families and 3.6% of the population were below the poverty line, including 4.7% of those under age 18 and 8.7% of those age 65 or over.

2000 census
As of the 2000 census, there were 3,032 people, 959 households, and 838 families residing in the township. The racial makeup of the township was 91.13% White, 4.55% African American, 1.12% Asian, 1.95% from other races, and 1.25% from two or more races. Hispanic or Latino people of any race were 3.89% of the population.

There were 959 households, out of which 49.5% had children under the age of 18 living with them, 77.4% were married couples living together, 6.9% had a female householder with no husband present, and 12.6% were non-families. 8.6% of all households were made up of individuals, and 4.0% had someone living alone who was 65 years of age or older. The average household size was 3.13 and the average family size was 3.35.

In the township, the population was spread out, with 31.4% under the age of 18, 5.2% from 18 to 24, 38.0% from 25 to 44, 18.6% from 45 to 64, and 6.8% who were 65 years of age or older. The median age was 34 years. For every 100 females, there were 98.6 males. For every 100 females age 18 and over, there were 98.6 males.

The median income for a household in the township was $83,790, and the median income for a family was $87,111. Males had a median income of $54,200 versus $38,571 for females. The per capita income for the township was $29,503. About 1.9% of families and 2.9% of the population were below the poverty line, including none of those under age 18 and 19.6% of those age 65 or over.

Economy
Along U.S. Route 322 at New Jersey Turnpike exit 2, plans call for almost  of retail and commercial space and an equal amount of office and flex park. Partnering with the state Office of Smart Growth, a major component of any development along Route 322 will include the use of transfer of development rights (TDR).

Government

Local government
Woolwich Township is governed under the Township form of New Jersey municipal government, one of 141 municipalities (of the 564) statewide that use this form, the second-most commonly used form of government in the state. The Township Committee is comprised of five members, who are elected directly by the voters at-large in partisan elections to serve three-year terms of office on a staggered basis, with either one or two seats coming up for election each year as part of the November general election in a three-year cycle. At an annual reorganization meeting, the Township Committee selects one of its members to serve as Mayor and another as Deputy Mayor.

, members of the Woolwich Township Committee are Mayor Craig A. Frederick (D, term on committee ends December 31, 2024; term as mayor ends 2022), Deputy Mayor Dennis Callahan (D, term on committee ends 2023; term as mayor ends 2022), Vernon R. Marino (D, 2023), Cindy Minhas (D, 2024) and Michael Nocentino (D, 2022).

In 2018, the township had an average property tax bill of $10,727, the highest in the county, compared to an average bill of $8,767 statewide.

Federal, state and county representation
Woolwich Township is located in the 2nd Congressional District and is part of New Jersey's 3rd state legislative district.

Politics
As of March 2011, there were a total of 6,032 registered voters in Woolwich, of which 1,675 (27.8%) were registered as Democrats, 1,287 (21.3%) were registered as Republicans and 3,067 (50.8%) were registered as Unaffiliated. There were 3 voters registered as Libertarians or Greens.

In the 2012 presidential election, Republican Mitt Romney received 52.0% of the vote (2,536 cast), ahead of Democrat Barack Obama with 46.9% (2,289 votes), and other candidates with 1.1% (53 votes), among the 4,897 ballots cast by the township's 6,682 registered voters (19 ballots were spoiled), for a turnout of 73.3%. In the 2008 presidential election, Democrat Barack Obama received 50.9% of the vote (2,316 cast), ahead of Republican John McCain with 47.6% (2,163 votes) and other candidates with 1.0% (44 votes), among the 4,547 ballots cast by the township's 5,858 registered voters, for a turnout of 77.6%. In the 2004 presidential election, Republican George W. Bush received 57.6% of the vote (1,767 ballots cast), outpolling Democrat John Kerry with 41.5% (1,273 votes) and other candidates with 0.5% (20 votes), among the 3,070 ballots cast by the township's 3,736 registered voters, for a turnout percentage of 82.2.

In the 2013 gubernatorial election, Republican Chris Christie received 70.8% of the vote (1,989 cast), ahead of Democrat Barbara Buono with 28.1% (788 votes), and other candidates with 1.1% (31 votes), among the 2,848 ballots cast by the township's 6,845 registered voters (40 ballots were spoiled), for a turnout of 41.6%. In the 2009 gubernatorial election, Republican Chris Christie received 55.1% of the vote (1,594 ballots cast), ahead of  Democrat Jon Corzine with 36.5% (1,055 votes), Independent Chris Daggett with 6.7% (195 votes) and other candidates with 0.4% (13 votes), among the 2,892 ballots cast by the township's 5,800 registered voters, yielding a 49.9% turnout.

Education
Public school students in pre-kindergarten through sixth grade attend the Swedesboro-Woolwich School District, a consolidated school district that serves students from both Swedesboro and Woolwich Township. As of the 2020–21 school year, the district, comprised of four schools, had an enrollment of 1,495 students and 138.7 classroom teachers (on an FTE basis), for a student–teacher ratio of 10.8:1. Schools in the district (with 2020–21 enrollment data from the National Center for Education Statistics) are Margaret C. Clifford School with 230 students in grades Pre-K–K (located in Swedesboro), Governor Charles C. Stratton School with 402 students in grades 1–2 (Woolwich Township), General Charles G. Harker School with 653 students in Grades 3–5 (Woolwich Township), and Walter H. Hill School with 210 students in Grade 6 (Swedesboro).

Public school students in seventh through twelfth grades are educated by the Kingsway Regional School District, which also serves students from East Greenwich Township, South Harrison Township and Swedesboro, with the addition of students from Logan Township who attend the district's high school as part of a sending/receiving relationship in which tuition is paid on a per-pupil basis by the Logan Township School District. Woolwich Township accounts for one third of district enrollment. As of the 2020–21 school year, the high school district, comprised of two schools, had an enrollment of 2,868 students and 207.8 classroom teachers (on an FTE basis), for a student–teacher ratio of 13.8:1. The schools in the district (with 2020–2021 enrollment data from the National Center for Education Statistics) are 
Kingsway Regional Middle School with 1,023 students in grades 7–8, and Kingsway Regional High School with 1,802 students in grades 9–12. Under a 2011 proposal, Kingsway would merge with its constituent member's K–6 districts to become a full K–12 district, with various options for including Logan Township as part of the consolidated district.

Students from across the county are eligible to apply to attend Gloucester County Institute of Technology, a four-year high school in Deptford Township that provides technical and vocational education. As a public school, students do not pay tuition to attend the school.

Guardian Angels Regional School is a K-8 school that operates under the auspices of the Roman Catholic Diocese of Camden. Its PreK-3 campus is in Gibbstown while its 4-8 campus is in Paulsboro.

Transportation

Roads and highways

Several major roadways traverse through the township.

Major county roads that pass through include County Road 538 and County Road 551.

Interstate 295 is accessible outside the municipality in neighboring Logan, Oldmans and Gloucester townships.

Public transportation
NJ Transit bus service between Salem and Philadelphia is available on the 401 route.

Wineries
 DiBella Winery

Community
In its April 2006 issue listing, "Top Places to Live in New Jersey", New Jersey Monthly magazine rated Woolwich as the worst place to live in all of New Jersey, ranking it 566th out of 566 municipalities. As of February 2008, the municipality was ranked as 547 out of 566 municipalities.

The community was labeled the "Number 1 Area Boomtown" by The Philadelphia Inquirer in 2005.

Historic sites
Gov. Charles C. Stratton House was built in 1791 and added to the National Register of Historic Places on January 29, 1973. The house was the home of New Jersey Governor Charles C. Stratton.

Moravian Church is a historic church building built in 1786 and added to the National Register of Historic Places in 1973.

Mount Zion African Methodist Episcopal Church and Mount Zion Cemetery is a historic church built in 1834 and added to the National Register of Historic Places in 2001. It played an important role in the Underground Railroad in South Jersey.

Notable people

People who were born in, residents of, or otherwise closely associated with Woolwich Township include:
 Jason Babin (born 1980), defensive end for the Philadelphia Eagles
 Marlon Byrd (born 1977), baseball outfielder for the Philadelphia Phillies
 Hank Fraley (born 1977), offensive lineman for the Cleveland Browns
 Ellis Hobbs (born 1983), former cornerback for the Philadelphia Eagles
 Michael McCary (born 1971), former bass singer of the R&B group Boyz II Men
 Kenneth Lacovara (born 1961), paleontologist best known for his discovery of Dreadnoughtus
 Jason Peters (born 1982), offensive tackle for the Philadelphia Eagles
 Jimmy Rollins (born 1978), Major League Baseball shortstop especially known for his time with the Philadelphia Phillies
 Adam Taliaferro (born 1982), paralyzed former college football player who has served in the New Jersey General Assembly

References

External links

 Official township website

 
1767 establishments in New Jersey
Populated places established in 1767
Township form of New Jersey government
Townships in Gloucester County, New Jersey